Mollans-sur-Ouvèze (Vivaro-Alpine: Molan) is a commune in the Drôme department in southeastern France.

Population

See also
Communes of the Drôme department

References

External links

Mon Mollans-sur Ouvèze

Communes of Drôme